Chaerophyllum elegans is a flowering plant species in the genus Chaerophyllum found in the Alps from Switzerland, France and Italy.

 Vernacular names
 chérophylle élégant (French)
 Alpen-Kälberkropf (German)
 Schönkälberkropf (German)
 zierlicher Kerbel (German)
 zierlicher Kälberkropf (German)
 cerfoglio elegante (Italian)

Its EPPO code is CHPEL.

References

External links 

 Chaerophyllum elegans at Muséum National d'Histoire Naturelle (French)

elegans
Flora of the Alps
Flora of France
Flora of Italy
Flora of Switzerland
Plants described in 1828